INTERMAT (formerly EXPOMAT) is an international exhibition of equipment, machinery and techniques for the construction and materials industries, held every three years in Paris. The exhibition is organised by CISMA and Seimat, French professional trade unions for the equipment industry, together with Comexposium, a French trade show organiser.

History 
The exhibition was initially held at the Paris – Le Bourget Airport, and known as EXPOMAT. In 1988, it moved to the Parc des Expositions de Villepinte and was renamed INTERMAT.

Several manufacturers display their construction machinery and equipment in an outdoor demonstration area called INTERMAT Demo, where they can demonstrate machinery and equipment performance in simulated working conditions. The programme includes demonstrations of site machinery: backhoe loaders, mechanical diggers, mini-excavators, loaders and graders.

Construction equipment manufacturers who showcase their products at the exhibition include Caterpillar, Komatsu, Hitachi, Volvo, Liebherr, JCB, Bobcat Company, Haulotte Group, Case New Holland, John Deere, and Michelin.

References 

 Bilan d'Intermat 2012 Forum Chantiers (Publié le 18/07/2012)
 Bilan d'Intermat : un baromètre de la croissance rassurant pour 2012 BFM Business  (Publié le 02/05/2012)
 BILAN D’INTERMAT 2012 Les Routiers
 15,8% de visiteurs en plus lors d’Intermat 2012 Le Moniteur.fr (Publié le 23/04/2012)

Exhibitions
Trade fairs in France